Term thrombin-activatable fibrinolysis inhibitor may refer to:
 Carboxypeptidase B2, an enzyme that in humans is encoded by the CPB2 gene
 Lysine carboxypeptidase, an enzyme class